Tomasz Kafarski (born 13 January 1975) is a Polish football manager and former player who played as a winger. He is currently in charge of I liga club Sandecja Nowy Sącz.

References

External links
  Profile at Lechia Gdansk
 

1975 births
Living people
Sportspeople from Pomeranian Voivodeship
People from Kościerzyna
Polish footballers
Association football wingers
Kaszubia Kościerzyna players
Lechia Gdańsk players
Polish football managers
Lechia Gdańsk managers
MKS Cracovia managers
Flota Świnoujście managers
Olimpia Grudziądz managers
Bytovia Bytów managers
Górnik Łęczna managers
Sandecja Nowy Sącz managers
Ekstraklasa managers
I liga managers
II liga managers